Todd Eugene Okerlund (born September 6, 1964) is an American former professional ice hockey right winger.

Okerlund was drafted 168th overall by the New York Islanders in the 1982 NHL Entry Draft and then spent four seasons playing for the University of Minnesota.  However, his pro career was cut short due to a chronic knee injury. He played one professional season, playing 13 games for the Springfield Indians of the American Hockey League and 4 games for the New York Islanders and also played on the 1988 United States Olympic ice hockey team before retiring.

As of 2012, Okerlund lived in the Minneapolis–Saint Paul, Minnesota area and worked in advertising.

Personal life
Okerlund is the son of "Mean" Gene Okerlund, a longtime pro wrestling announcer for the AWA, WWF (now WWE) and WCW.

Okerlund ran the professional wrestling media company Classic Wrestling from 2000 to 2018, packaging vintage wrestling footage into shows that aired on both pay per view and online streaming services.

Career statistics

Regular season and playoffs

International

References

External links
 

1964 births
Living people
American men's ice hockey right wingers
Ice hockey players from Minnesota
Ice hockey players at the 1988 Winter Olympics
Minnesota Golden Gophers men's ice hockey players
New York Islanders draft picks
New York Islanders players
Olympic ice hockey players of the United States
People from Burnsville, Minnesota
Springfield Indians players